Daptus pictus is a species of ground beetle in the subfamily Harpalinae.

References

Harpalinae
Beetles described in 1823